The Related Companies, L.P. is an American real estate firm in New York City, with offices and developments in Boston, Chicago, Los Angeles, Las Vegas, Miami, San Francisco, Abu Dhabi, London, São Paulo and Shanghai. Related has more than 3,000 employees and is the largest landlord in New York City with over 8,000 residential rental units under ownership.

Related manages about $4 billion of equity capital on behalf of sovereign wealth funds, public pension plans, multi-managers, endowments, Taft-Hartley benefits plans, and family offices.

Related has developed mixed-use projects such as Time Warner Center and the Bronx Terminal Market in New York City and CityPlace in West Palm Beach. Related is developing the Hudson Yards Redevelopment Project, which comprises  in Manhattan's Chelsea and Hell's Kitchen neighborhoods.

History
In 1972, Stephen M. Ross founded Related Companies with a $10,000 loan from his mother and a business plan focused on affordable housing.

In 1985, the company constructed 225 Rector Place as a rental apartment complex. It sold the building in 2005 to developer Yair Levy and then bought the building back for $82.8 million after the lender, Anglo Irish Bank, foreclosed on the property in November 2010.

In January 2012, the company closed an $825 million distressed asset fund.

In 2012, in partnership with HFZ Capital Group and CIM Group, the company took over development of One Madison after the original developer filed for bankruptcy protection.

In September 2012, Ross resigned as chief executive officer of the company and was replaced with Jeff Blau.

In March 2014, the United States Department of Justice filed a lawsuit against the company and several other large NYC developers, claiming failure to comply with the Americans with Disabilities Act of 1990.

In July 2014, the company completed construction of Abington House, a rental apartment property on the High Line designed by architect Robert A. M. Stern.

The company has an agreement to redevelop Grand Avenue in Bunker Hill, Los Angeles. In October 2014 as an initial step in the Grand Avenue Project, they completed The Emerson, an apartment tower  marketed to older adults that includes an affordable housing component.

In January 2016, the company proposed developing a $6.5 billion project on the site of the former Santa Clara All Purpose Landfill.

In February 2017, Fast Company named the company as one of The Most Innovative Companies of 2017 for its work on Hudson Yards.

In May 2017, the company contacted officials in Boca Raton about potentially redeveloping its city hall and municipal complex downtown.

In July 2017, the company completed the 690-unit Brickell Heights condominium development in Miami and sold most of its commercial space for $17.5 million.

References

Real estate companies established in 1972
Privately held companies of the United States
Real estate companies of the United States
Companies based in New York City
1972 establishments in New York City